DeKalb County Courthouse may refer to:

DeKalb County Courthouse (Missouri), Maysville, Missouri
Old DeKalb County Courthouse (Georgia), Decatur, Georgia, listed on the National Register of Historic Places